Harpa Sif Eyjólfsdóttir (born 1987) is an Icelandic team handball player. She plays on the Icelandic national team, and participated at the 2011 World Women's Handball Championship in Brazil.

References

1987 births
Living people
Harpa Sif Eyjolfsdottir